Frédéric Jules Sichel (14 May 1802 – 11 November 1868) was a German-born, French physician and entomologist.

Sichel was born in Frankfurt am Main. From 1820 he studied medicine at the universities of Würzburg, Tübingen and Berlin, then from 1825 to 1829 worked as assistant to ophthalmologist Friedrich Jäger von Jaxtthal in Vienna. In 1829 he relocated to Paris, where in 1833 he received his doctorate with the dissertation-thesis "Propositions générales sur l'ophthalmologie, suivies de l'histoire de l'ophthalmie rhumatismale". In 1833 he acquired French citizenship.

In 1832 he established the first ophthalmic clinic in Paris, and for a period of time, gave courses in ophthalmology at the Hôpital Saint-Antoine. He is credited with bringing modern ophthalmology to France from Austria and Germany. Sichel trained several famous ophthalmologists (Louis-Auguste Desmarres, Charles Deval, Charles de Hübsch and Wiktor Szokalski) at his Paris clinic. He was interested in oriental languages and archaeology, writing extensively on the seals of Roman doctors. In entomology he specialized in Hymenoptera – his collection being donated to the Muséum National d'Histoire Naturelle. Sichel died in Paris.

Publications
Archeology 
Nouveau recueil de pierres sigillaires d'oculistes romains pour la plupart inédites... (V. Masson et fils, Paris, 1866).

Medical
Traité de l'ophthalmie, la cataracte et l'amaurose, pour servir de supplément au Traité des maladies des yeux de Weller (G. Baillière, Paris, 1837).
 Mémoire sur le glaucome (imprimerie de N.-J. Gregoir, Brussels, 1842). 
 Iconographie ophthalmologique, ou description... des maladies de l'organe de la vue... Text accompagné d'un atlas de 80 planches... (J.-B. Baillière et fils, Paris, 1852-1859).

Entomology 
 Guide de la chasse des hyménoptères (Deyrolle fils, Paris, 1859, new edition in 1868). 
 Catalogus specierum generis Scolia (sensu latiori), continens specierum diagnoses, descriptiones synonymiamque, additis annotationibus explanatoriis criticisque conscripserunt Henricus de Saussure... (Catalogue des espèces de l'ancien genre Scolia, contenant les diagnoses, les descriptions et la synonymie des espèces, avec des remarques explicatives et critiques) (V. Masson et fils, Paris, 1864).

Sources
Translated with minor additions from French Wikipedia
Anthony Musgrave (1932). Bibliography of Australian Entomology, 1775-1930, with biographical notes on authors and collectors, Royal Zoological Society of News South Wales (Sydney) : viii + 380.

External links
 whonamedit
 Gaedike, R.; Groll, E. K. & Taeger, A. 2012: Bibliography of the entomological literature from the beginning until 1863 : online database - version 1.0 - Senckenberg Deutsches Entomologisches Institut. Bibliography
Zoologica Göttingen State and University Library Étienne Mulsant, 1869 Notice sur le Dr. Jules Sichel Annales de la Société Linnéenne de Lyon et des Société Botanique de Lyon, 17 (N.S.): 383-410.

1802 births
1868 deaths
French entomologists
Presidents of the Société entomologique de France
Hymenopterists
19th-century French physicians
French ophthalmologists
French archaeologists
Physicians from Frankfurt